Clatrodes is a genus of moths of the family Crambidae. It contains only one species, Clatrodes squaleralis, which is found in Madagascar.

References

Pyraustinae
Crambidae genera
Taxa named by Pierre Viette
Monotypic moth genera